Pterygoid, from the Greek for 'winglike', may refer to: 

 Pterygoid bone, a bone of the palate of many vertebrates
 Pterygoid processes of the sphenoid bone
 Lateral pterygoid plate
 Medial pterygoid plate
 Lateral pterygoid muscle 
 Medial pterygoid muscle
 a branch of the Mandibular nerve